East Pomio Rural LLG is a local-level government (LLG) of East New Britain Province, Papua New Guinea. The Sulka language is spoken in the LLG, including in the village of Guma.

Wards
01. Lamarain
02. Long
03. Hoya
04. Kaukum
05. Milim
06. Guma
07. Klampun
08. Sampun-Tagul
09. Teimtop-Wawas
10. Bain
11. Raolman
12. Ivai
13. Setwei

References

Local-level governments of East New Britain Province